The Christchurch by-election of 1891 was a by-election during the 11th New Zealand Parliament held on 9 October that year in the  electorate. It was triggered by the resignation of sitting member Westby Perceval who had been appointed as the new Agent-General in the United Kingdom.

The election would later come under protest by Eden George who claimed that nominations had been accepted too late to warrant candidacy.

Results
The following table gives the election results:

References

Christchurch 1891
1891 elections in New Zealand
Politics of Christchurch
1890s in Christchurch